Sultana Wahnón Bensusan (born 8 May 1960) is a Spanish essayist and literary critic, a professor at the University of Granada specializing in literary theory and comparative literature.

Academic activity
Sultana Wahnón graduated in Spanish Philology in 1982, with a licentiate in the poetry of the National Literature Prize winner , a Melillan author to whom she has dedicated two books. Her doctoral thesis, defended in 1987 and published by Rodopi in 1998, consists of a description of the Spanish fascist aesthetic system and the analysis of its progressive dissolution in postwar literary criticism. Specializing in literary theory, she has written books such as Introducción a la historia de las teorías literarias (1991) and Teoría de la literatura y de la interpretación literaria (2008).

In 1995 she began a line of research on the theater of García Lorca, a subject on which she continues to work today. In 1995 her book Lenguaje y literatura was released, in which she talks with the main representatives of the linguistic turn and hermeneutic skepticism. In 2000 she presented her hypothesis on the innocence of Josef K. in The Trial, which she developed extensively in the book Kafka y la tragedia judía (2003). The hermeneutic discussion contained in this book is continued in more recent publications such as El problema de la interpretación literaria. Fuentes y bases teóricas para una hermenéutica constructiva (2009) and Perspectivas actuales de hermenéutica literaria. Para otra ética de la interpretación (2014).

In 1992 Wahnón entered the field of Cultural and Jewish Studies with a work on the Hebrew poetics of Moses ibn Ezra, and another on the role of the Wandering Jew in One Hundred Years of Solitude. Her most recent work in this line, from 2010, deals with the images of the Holocaust in post-war Spanish poetry. In this same period she participated in debates on anti-Zionism and antisemitism.

From 2006 to 2007 she contributed to the national newspaper ABC with a series of articles on the Palestinian-Israeli conflict. In recent years she has continued to develop this critical activity in some articles on the current university model. In 2014 she published En fuga irrevocable. Un ensayo de crítica de la cultura, which deals with textual proliferation in the cultural and university spheres.

Professional career
In 1977 Wahnón began her studies in Hispanic Philology at the University of Granada, where she has developed most of her professional and teaching activities. In 1990, she obtained a position as professor of the Department of General Linguistics and Literary Theory. In 2003 she directed the Instituto Cervantes of Utrecht. In 2004 she obtained the chair of Literary Theory and Comparative Literature. From 2008 to 2011 she directed Afinidades. Revista de literatura y pensamiento, a publication of comparative and pro-European character. In 2009 she was elected president of the Spanish Association of Literary Theory (ASETEL), a position she held until 2013. During her presidency, the association's First International Congress was held. Imágenes del Holocausto en la poesía española de posguerra.

Books

References

1960 births
20th-century Spanish women writers
21st-century Spanish women writers
Comparative literature academics
Literary theorists
Living people
People from Melilla
Spanish literary critics
Spanish women literary critics
Spanish philologists
Women philologists
Spanish women academics
Spanish essayists
Spanish women essayists
University of Granada alumni
Academic staff of the University of Granada